Milfield is a village in Northumberland, England about  northwest of Wooler. The A697 road passes through the village.

History 
Milfield is the likely location of the Northumbrian royal settlement of Maelmin, given "mael" is a Brythonic word meaning "field". Bede tells us that a residence was built at Maelmin to supersede Edwin of Northumbria's residence of Ad-Gefrin at Yeavering.
Evidence of a high-status Anglo-Saxon settlement at Milfield strongly suggests that this is the location of Maelmin, because of its proximity to Yeavering.

On Milfield Plain, which is part of the bed of the prehistoric Lake of Glendale, was fought one of the many battles between Scots and English. In the month before the tragedy of Flodden, some Scots, under Alexander Home, 3rd Lord Home, were returning from a raid into England where they had burnt several villages. Laden with booty which they had "lifted", Home's men were surprised by a band of English under Sir William Bulmer of Brancepeth in County Durham. The Durham men were victorious and for long years afterwards the Scots name for the road through Milfield was "The Ill Road". Many years after the rout of Home's men, General Monk waited at Milfield with his forces before his momentous march south which brought about the Restoration.

During the Second World War, an air training unit operated from the nearby RAF Milfield.

Notable people 
One of Northumberland's most notable daughters, Josephine Grey, the social reformer, was born at Milfield House, about six miles from Wooler. This woman, who did so much valuable work in the nineteenth century to combat the social evils of the day, is more generally known by her married name of Butler. A college was named after her at Durham University and a residency block there was named Milfield in honour of her birthplace. At the end of her long life she returned to her beloved Northumberland and is buried in Kirknewton churchyard under the shadow of Yeavering Bell.

References

External links

Northumberland Communities (Accessed: 27 November 2008)

Villages in Northumberland